Highhill (or High Hill) is a ghost town in Medicine Township, Rooks County, Kansas, United States.

History
Highhill was issued a post office in 1885. The post office was discontinued in 1891.  There is nothing left of Highhill.

References

Former populated places in Rooks County, Kansas
Former populated places in Kansas
1885 establishments in Kansas
Populated places established in 1885